Graphium bathycles, the veined jay, is a butterfly in the family Papilionidae, that is found in the Indomalayan realm.

Subspecies
Graphium bathycles bathycles (nominate: Java; undifferentiated: China, Sikkim to Assam, Burma)
Graphium bathycles bathycloides (Honrath, 1884) (southern Thailand, Peninsular Malaya, Sumatra, Borneo, Philippines: Palawan, Balabac, Busuanga)

References
 
Page, M.G.P & Treadaway, C.G. 2003 Schmetterlinge der Erde, Butterflies of the world Part XVII (17), Papilionidae IX Papilionidae of the Philippine Islands. Edited by Erich Bauer and Thomas Frankenbach Keltern: Goecke & Evers; Canterbury: Hillside Books. 
Tsukada, E. & Nishiyama, Y. 1982. Papilionidae. In: Tsukada, E. (ed): Butterflies of the South East Asian Islands. Volume 1. Plapac Co., Tokyo

External links
External images of bathycles, bathycloides, manlius, tereus

bath
Butterflies of Indochina
Butterflies of Borneo
Butterflies of Asia
Butterflies described in 1831